Penny Rain is the second part of the fifth studio album Sun Dance & Penny Rain released by Aimer. It was released on April 10, 2019 in a regular CD only edition and with Sun Dance in three versions: a limited 2 CD + 2 BD + Special Storage Box + Sun Dance Jigsaw Puzzle, a limited 2 CD + BD edition (Type-A), and a limited 2CD + DVD edition (Type-B). Sun Dance and Penny Rain were Aimer's first new studio albums since daydream in 2016.

Penny Rain peaked at #2 ahead of Sun Dance on Oricon's Weekly Album Chart on April 22, 2019 and charted for 26 weeks.

Production 
In February 2018, Aimer thought about a concept for her next album after releasing her single "Ref:rain". She then came up with the concept of "Sun and Rain" and used it for her "soleil et pluie" Hall Tour from October 2018 to January 2019. In contrast to the lively and up-tempo themes of Sun Dance, Penny Rain features darker themed tones and more ballads, with the lead track "I beg you" incorporating a Middle Eastern rhythm. The album also features collaborations with Yuki Kajiura, Cocco, TK, and Hiroyuki Sawano.

Track listing

Personnel 
Credits are adapted from the album's liner notes.

 Yuki Kajiura - producer (tracks 1,2,9), keyboards (tracks 1,2,9), programming (tracks 1,2,9), lyrics (tracks 2, 9), music (tracks 1,2,9), arranger (tracks 1,2,9), 
 Yasunori Mori - director (tracks 1, 2, 9)
 Takashi Koiwa - recording (tracks 1, 2, 9), mixing engineer (tracks 1,2, 9), protools operator (tracks 1,2 9)
 KIYO KIDO STRINGS -  strings (tracks 1, 9)
 Koichi Korenaga - guitar (tracks 2, 9)
 Kyoichi Sato - drums (tracks 2, 9)
 Tomoharu “Jr. Takahashi - bass (tracks 2, 9)
 aimerrhythm - lyrics (tracks 3, 4, 7, 10)
 Masahiro Tobinai - music (tracks 3, 4, 7), arranger, (tracks 4, 5, 7) programming (tracks 4, 5, 7), all instruments (tracks 4, 5, 7)
 Kenji Tamai - arranger (tracks 3-5, 7, 10), producer (tracks 3-5, 7, 10) , executive producer 
 Rui Momota - arranger (tracks 3, 10), programming, (tracks 3, 10), all instruments (tracks 3, 10)
 Masaki Mori - recording (tracks 3, 4, 5, 7, 10)
 Satoshi Kumasaka - mixing (tracks 3-5, 7)
 Hideki Morioka - director (tracks 3-5, 7, 10), organizer (tracks 3-5, 7, 10)
 Kentaro Kondo - director (tracks 3-5, 7, 10), organizer (tracks 3-5, 7, 10)
 Cocco - lyrics (5), music (track 5)
 TK - lyrics(6), music (track 6), arranger (track 6), producer (track 6), recording (track 6), guitar(track 6), chorus (track 6)
 Tohru Takayama - recording (track 6), mixing (track 6)
 Shoichiro Ishii - recording (track 6)
 Matthew Soares - recording assistant (track 6)
 Seigen Tokuzawa - string arrangement (track 6)
 Bobo - drums (track 6)
 Hiroo Yamaguichi - bass (track 6)
 Honoka Sato - 1st Violin (track 6)
 Yoko Fujinawa - 1st Violin (track 6)
 Ayaka Jomoto - 1st Violin (track 6)
 Natsue Kameda - 2nd Violin (track 6)
 Matsuri Mikuni - 2nd Violin (track 6)
 Hiroyuki Sawano - lyrics (track 8), music (track 8), arranger (track 8), producer (track 8), piano (track 8), keyboard (track 8), all instruments (track 8)
 Mitsunori Aizawa - recording (track 8), mixing engineer (track 8) protools operator (track 8)
 Ken Higeshiro - drums (track 8)
 Toshino Tanabe - bass (track 8)
 Hiroshi Iimuro - guitars (track 8)
 Harutoshi Ito - guitars (track 8)
 AlbatoLuce - music (track 10)
 Hitoshi Konno - strings (track 10)
 Kazuyuki Doki - musician coordinator (track 10)
 Yuji Chinone - mastering engineer (tracks 1-5, 7-10)
 Joe LaPorta - mastering engineer (track 6)
 Toru Takeuchi - A&R in chief

 Mio Uchimura - A&R
 Yu Tsuzuki - sales promotion
 Shomaru Tada - sales promotion
 Yuki Terae - sales promotion

 Megumi Miyai - products coordination 
 Kazuyo Takeuchi - products coordination 
 Go Matsuda - art direction , design
 Arata Kato - photograph
 Yuuka Akaishi - styling
 Aya Murakami - hair & make-up
 Ryota Torisu - artist management
 Mami Fujino - artist management
 Moe Hattori - assistant artist management
 Hiroaki Sano - supervise
 Manabu Tsujino - executive producer 
 Yoshichika Matsumoto - executive producer

Charts

Album
Weekly charts

Year-end charts

Singles

Awards and nominations

References

External links
  (Japanese)
 Penny Rain Aimer on agehasprings
 Penny Rain Aimer on quia
 
  
 Penny Rain / Aimer  on VGMdb

Aimer albums
2019 albums
Japanese-language albums
SME Records albums